Franco Properzi Curti (born Dehradun, India, 4 November 1965) is a former Indian-born Italian rugby union player and a current assistant coach. He played as a prop.

He was born in India, due to his father work there. He returned to Italy with his family, starting his rugby player career at Amatori Rugby Milano, where he would play from 1984/85 to 1997/98. During his presence at Milano, he won 4 titles of the Italian Premiership, in 1990/91, 1992/93, 1994/95 and 1995/96, and the Cup of Italy, in 1994/95. Properzi moved to Benetton Treviso in 1998/99, where he would spend the rest of his career, finished in 2002/03, at 37 years old. He was also successful there, winning 3 titles of Italian Champions, in 1998/99, 2000/01 and 2002/03.

Properzi had a notable career at the service of Italy, counting 53 caps, from 1990 to 2001, with 3 tries scored, 15 points in aggregate. He was called three times for the Rugby World Cup finals. In the 1991 Rugby World Cup, he played in all the three games, in the 1995 Rugby World Cup, he was used in all the three games once again, and at the 1999 Rugby World Cup, he played two games. He never scored in any of his presences at the competition.

The highest point of his international career was the title of the European Nations Cup for the 1997 edition, when Italy won France by 40-32, at 22 March 1997, in Grenoble.

Properzi, aged 35 years old, had his last caps for Italy at the 2001 Six Nations Championship, being used in three games.

He has been assistant coach since the finish of his player career. He was first assistant coach of Benetton Rugby Treviso (2004/05-2009/10) and he is currently of Mogliano Rugby, since 2010/11.

External links
Franco Properzi International Statistics

1965 births
Living people
Italian rugby union players
Italy international rugby union players
Rugby union props